The 2012 Phillips 66 Big 12 Men's Basketball Championship was held at the Sprint Center in Kansas City, Missouri from March 7 until March 10, 2012. Due to a major conference realignment that significantly impacted the Big 12, It was the first tournament with 10 teams participating. After the 2010–11 season, Colorado left for the Pac-12 and Nebraska joined the Big Ten.  It was also the final appearance in this event for Texas A&M and Missouri before they joined the Southeastern Conference for the 2012–13 season. The conference will continue to have 10 schools in that season, as TCU and West Virginia will join the Big 12, respectively from the Mountain West Conference and Big East Conference.

The tournament, and the automatic bid to the NCAA tournament that went with it, was won by one of the departing members, Missouri.

Radio Coverage
All teams were able to have their local radio media groups carry their games in the Big 12 Tournament. Additionally, the tournament semifinals and championship game were broadcast on select regional ESPN Radio affiliates and nationally on ESPNRadio.com. This was a change from years past, in which ESPN Radio would broadcast the games nationally. However due to the ACC's contract with ESPN now being in effect, ESPN Radio affiliates must choose whether they want to carry the Big 12 semis and championship or carry the entire ACC Tournament.

Seeding
The Tournament consisted of a 10 team single-elimination tournament with the top 6 seeds receiving a bye.

Schedule
The semi-finals were produced by, and aired on, the Big 12 Network in Big 12 Network territories. However, they were aired on ESPNU for the rest of the nation. All games were available via streaming through Watch ESPN's ESPN3 except in Big 12 Network territories, where games that did not air on ESPN or ESPN2 were blacked out.

Bracket

All Times Central

Game Summaries

All-Tournament Team
Most Outstanding Player – Kim English, Missouri

See also
2012 Big 12 Conference women's basketball tournament
2012 NCAA Division I men's basketball tournament
2011–12 NCAA Division I men's basketball rankings

References

External links
 Official 2012 Big 12 Men's Basketball Tournament Bracket
 

Tournament
Big 12 men's basketball tournament
Big 12 men's basketball tournament
Big 12 men's basketball tournament
College sports tournaments in Missouri